Knives with Journalism is an album by American punk rock band Alien Father.

Originally released in May 2008 on Brother and Brother Records, Knives with Journalism was re-released online in August 2008 on BBN Music. In October 2008 it was re-releases again on 75 or Less Records. Its second re-release was limited to 50 silkscreened copies on white jackets.

Track listing
"Buckle Up"  – 2:27
"Sails on Boats... Beautiful"  – 2:31
"Gorilla Maps"  – 1:18
"Mike and the Bike"  – 1:57
"Alex Ander"  - 2:49
"I'm Innocent"  – 4:03
"Xangadix/Yr Not My Dad"  – 2:51
"The Legend of Melvin"  – 1:57
"Bastard"  – 3:55
"The Farmer"  – 4:41

Personnel
Dave Hallinger – vocals/guitar/bass
Curtis Regian – vocals/synth/piano/bass/guitar
Mike Topley – drums/backing vocals
Alex Basile - guest vocals on Track 7
Alex Seiz – recording and mastering

External links 

2008 albums
Alien Father albums